German submarine U-437 was a Type VIIC U-boat of Nazi Germany's Kriegsmarine during World War II. She carried out eleven patrols, but sank no ships. She was a member of sixteen wolfpacks. She was damaged by British bombs in Norway on 4 October 1944 and stricken; she was broken up in 1946.

Design
German Type VIIC submarines were preceded by the shorter Type VIIB submarines. U-437 had a displacement of  when at the surface and  while submerged. She had two shafts and two  propellers.

U-437 was fitted with five  torpedo tubes (four fitted at the bow and one at the stern), fourteen torpedoes, one  SK C/35 naval gun, 220 rounds, and a  C/30 anti-aircraft gun. The boat had a complement of between forty-four and sixty.

Service history
The submarine was laid down on 16 April 1940 at Schichau-Werke in Danzig (now Gdansk) as yard number 1479, launched on 26 July 1941 and commissioned on 25 October under the command of Kapitänleutnant Werner-Karl Schultze.

She served with the 6th U-boat Flotilla from 25 October 1941 for training and stayed with that organization from 1 April 1942 until 5 October 1944.

First patrol
U-436s first patrol was from Kiel in Germany and took in the Atlantic Ocean, which she reached via the gap separating the Faroe and Shetland Islands. She arrived at St. Nazaire in occupied France on 16 April 1942. (She would continue to use this port for almost the rest of her career).

Second, third, fourth and fifth patrols
The boat's second sortie was as far as northwest of the Azores, but produced no results.

Her third foray took her to the Caribbean Sea and at 68 days, was her longest.

Patrol number four was relatively uneventful. It terminated at St. Nazaire on 15 November 1942.

U-436s fifth patrol was north of the Azores.

Sixth patrol
Her sixth effort was marked by an attack by a Leigh Light equipped Vickers Wellington of No. 172 Squadron RAF in the Bay of Biscay on 23 April 1943.

Seventh patrol
U-437s seventh patrol was divided into a series of short voyages, with the exception of the last part; but success continued to elude her.

Eighth patrol
It was a similar story for her eighth outing.

Ninth and tenth patrols
For the boat's ninth patrol, she did not leave the Bay of Biscay.

Following the Allied advance after D-Day, U-437 moved to Bordeaux after her tenth sortie.

Eleventh patrol
Reversing the course of her first patrol, including the Iceland/Faroes 'gap', the submarine arrived at Bergen in Norway on 21 September 1944.

Fate
U-437 was damaged by British bombs in Bergen on 4 October 1944; she was stricken a day later. She was broken up in 1946.

Wolfpacks
U-437 took part in 16 wolfpacks, namely:
 Endrass (12 – 17 June 1942)
 Blitz (22 – 26 September 1942)
 Tiger (26 – 30 September 1942)
 Luchs (1 – 6 October 1942)
 Panther (6 – 12 October 1942)
 Leopard (12 – 19 October 1942)
 Veilchen (27 October – 4 November 1942)
 Robbe (16 – 20 February 1943)
 Rossbach (6 – 9 October 1943)
 Schlieffen (14 – 22 October 1943)
 Siegfried (22 – 27 October 1943)
 Siegfried 2 (27 – 30 October 1943)
 Jahn (30 October – 2 November 1943)
 Igel 2 (15 – 17 February 1944)
 Hai 1 (17 – 22 February 1944)
 Preussen (22 February – 22 March 1944

References

Bibliography

External links

German Type VIIC submarines
U-boats commissioned in 1941
1941 ships
Ships built in Danzig
World War II submarines of Germany
Maritime incidents in October 1944
Ships built by Schichau